Béatrice Agenin (born 30 July 1950 in Paris, France) is a French stage, film, television actress and stage director.

Career
Second prize of French National Academy of Dramatic Arts in 1974, she was hired at the Comédie-Française the same year, she was named Sociétaire in 1979 and chose to leave the Troupe in 1984.

Filmography

Theater

Dubbing

References

External links
 

1950 births
Living people
Actresses from Paris
French stage actresses
French film actresses
French television actresses
20th-century French novelists
21st-century French novelists
20th-century French actresses
21st-century French actresses
20th-century French women writers
21st-century French women writers